The following is a list of Michigan State Historic Sites in Calhoun County, Michigan. Sites marked with a dagger (†) are also listed on the National Register of Historic Places in Calhoun County, Michigan.


Current listings

See also
 National Register of Historic Places listings in Calhoun County, Michigan

Sources
 Historic Sites Online – Calhoun County. Michigan State Housing Developmental Authority. Accessed January 5, 2011.

References

Michigan State Historic Sites
Calhoun County
Tourist attractions in Calhoun County, Michigan